Blakeview is a northern suburb of Adelaide, South Australia. It is located in the City of Playford. Blakeview is predominantly a residential suburb, but also has two commercial areas and two education areas.

Geography
Blakeview is located to the northeast of Elizabeth and lies on the east side of Main North Road opposite Smithfield and Munno Para. There is a commercial area facing Main North Road in the oldest part of the suburb which includes a Coles Express service station and medical services. The Blakes Crossing subdivision north of Craigmore Road also has a commercial area, which includes Woolworths and Aldi supermarkets.

Blakeview was gazetted as a suburb in 1990, taking territory from Smithfield and Munno Para.

Demographics

The 2016 Census by the Australian Bureau of Statistics counted 7,229 persons in Blakeview on census night. Of these, 48.3% were male and 51.7% were female.

The majority of residents (77.0%) of people were born in Australia. The most common other countries of birth were England 7.6%, Scotland 1.2%, India 1.1%, New Zealand 0.9% and Philippines 0.7%.

The median age of people in Blakeview was 29 years. Children aged 0 - 14 years made up 24.9% of the population and people aged 65 years and over made up 6.8% of the population.

Education

The southern education precinct in Blakeview includes Blakeview Primary School on Omega Drive, Trinity College Blakeview adjacent to it on Park Lake Boulevard, with Craigmore High School next along, and a preschool centre across the road.

Blakes Crossing Christian College operated by Christian Community Ministries opened for reception to year 5 in 2014 and intends to gradually extend to year 12 and a total of 700 students. At the beginning of 2014 it had only six students enrolled, using the Lend Lease land sales offices for classrooms until the school's own buildings could be constructed. It is now sited in its own buildings, not far from the Blakes Crossing shopping precinct and parks.

Facilities and attractions

Parks
There are several parks and reserves throughout the suburb, especially along Smith Creek and Main Terrace. Many of the parks are provided with playground equipment.

Shopping
There is a neighbourhood shopping precinct on Main Terrace with two supermarkets, food outlets, butcher, newsagent, medical services and a bottle shop. There is also a commercial precinct fronting Main North Road in the southern part of Blakeview with a fuel outlet, health and retail facilities, and another fuel outlet on Main North Road in the northern part of the suburb.

Transportation
Blakeview is serviced by Main North Road, connecting the suburb to Adelaide city centre.

Blakeview is serviced by several public transport services run by the Adelaide Metro to Elizabeth, Smithfield, Munno Para, Adelaide and a school bus to Roma Mitchell Secondary College.

See also

List of Adelaide suburbs

References

External links

Suburbs of Adelaide